The Early College High School Initiative in the United States allows students to receive a high school diploma and an associate degree, or up to two years of college credit, by taking a mixture of high school and college classes. This differs from dual enrollment, where students are enrolled in a traditional high school and take college classes, whereas early college students take high school classes in preparation for full college workloads. At early colleges, students also have fewer high school classes because some of their college classes replace their high school classes. Early colleges differ from closely related middle colleges. ECHS students spend their school day at college, and go to their home school occasionally for events such as football games, homecoming, and prom. 

The ECHS Initiative began in 2002 with funding from the Bill & Melinda Gates Foundation, among others. The first early college in the United States, Bard College at Simon's Rock, was founded in 1966. Today, more than 230 early colleges across 28 states serve 50,000+ students.

Data

 92% of early college students graduate from high school, versus the national rate of 69 percent.
 86% of graduates enroll in college the next semester after high school graduation.
 91% of early college graduates earn transferable college credit.
 44% of graduates at schools open 4+ years earn at least one year of college credit.
 24% of graduates at schools open 4+ years earn two years of college credit or an associate degree.
 70% of early college students are students of color.
 59% of early college students are classified as eligible for free or reduced lunch (used as a conservative estimate of how many students' families are low-income). Most early colleges are funded to target first generation college, low-income families, and/or academically gifted students.

Intermediary partners

Fifteen intermediary partners work directly with early college schools, school districts, and postsecondary institutions. They provide start-up and ongoing technical support, guidance, and professional development for their networks of schools.

 Center for Native Education
 Center of Excellence for Leadership of Learning (CELL) at University of Indianapolis
 City University of New York
 Communities Foundation of Texas/Texas High School Project
 Foundation for California Community Colleges
 Gateway to College National Network
 Georgia Board of Regents
 Middle College National Consortium
 National Council of La Raza
 NC New Schools/Breakthrough Learning 
 SECME, Inc.
Surry Community College
 Utah Partnership for Education
 Woodrow Wilson National Fellowship Foundation

See also 
Dual enrollment
Early entrance to college

References 
Notes

Bibliography

External links 
Early Colleges home page
 ECHSI evaluation reports by the American Institutes for Research

Adolescence
Educational stages
School terminology
School types

Early College High Schools